Asante Africa Foundation is a non profit organization that educates East Africa's youth to confidently address life's challenges, thrive in the global
economy, and catalyze positive change. Its headquarters are in Oakland, California with offices in Samburu, Kenya and Arusha, Tanzania. Asante Africa Foundation's mission is "To educate and empower the next generation of change agents, whose dreams and actions transform the future for Africa and the world."

The 100% local staff partners closely with educators, influencers, and national and county governments to work within the existing educational system. Additionally, the model focuses on including mothers, male counterparts (siblings, male peers and fathers), and community members to help understand the root causes of barriers to education for young women and marginalized youth. These efforts result in sustainable and scalable programs with measurable results.

History
Asante Africa Foundation was established in 2006 by Erna Grasz, a corporate executive, Emmy Moshi, a Tanzanian entrepreneur, and school principal and a member of the Kenyan Maasai tribe. The foundation began as a small two-village project, and has since expanded across Kenya and Tanzania, equipping the most rural and vulnerable youth with quality education coupled with mentoring, tools, and the hands-on skills they need to tackle life's challenges.

Programs
Asante Africa Foundation works to increase access to education and improve educational quality for East African youth and children. The organization focuses on 4 programs which are:
 Wezesha Vijana (Girls' Advancement Program)  
 Leadership & Entrepreneurship Incubator (LEI) Program  
 Accelerated Learning in the Classroom Program 
 Scholarships Program

Asante Africa places an emphasis on quality learning in the classroom, gender equity in education, and 21st-century-relevant, learner-centered curriculum that supports higher school enrollment, retention, and academic achievement. These efforts develop the cognitive skills, decision-making capabilities, and leadership qualities needed to succeed far beyond the classroom. The programs work together to:
	
 Create quality learning environments (eliminating barriers to education)	
 Improve teaching quality and learning in schools (engaging students in the classroom through child-centered learning and critical thinking)	
 Give merit-based scholarships (building the next generation of leaders with targeted support)
 Providing youth with school-based clubs, training sessions, and cross-border summits, job readiness, entrepreneurial skills, and personal development.
 Provide tools, resources, support, and training for schools, teachers, and students

References

  2019 Impact Report

External links

https://asanteafrica.org/girls-program/
https://asanteafrica.org/leadership-program/
https://asanteafrica.org/classroomlearning/
https://asanteafrica.org/scholars/
https://asanteafrica.org/programs/#section-programs-impact
https://asanteafrica.org/resources/

Charities based in California
Educational charities based in the United States
Foreign charities operating in Kenya
Foreign charities operating in Tanzania